The 2018 Supercars Championship (known for commercial reasons as the 2018 Virgin Australia Supercars Championship) was an FIA-sanctioned international motor racing series for Supercars. It was the twentieth running of the Supercars Championship and the twenty-second series in which Supercars have contested the premier Australian touring car title. Teams and drivers competed in thirty-one races at sixteen venues across Australia and New Zealand for the championship titles. Scott McLaughin won his maiden title at the final race in Newcastle, while Red Bull Holden Racing Team won the Teams Championship at Pukekohe.

The 2018 season saw the introduction of the first Gen 2 Supercars, which opened up the category up to a wider variety of body shapes and engine configurations. The championship saw the introduction of the hatchback Holden ZB Commodore, marking the first time since 1994 that a car with a body shape other than a four-door sedan has competed.

Teams and drivers
Holden and Nissan were represented by factory-backed teams Triple Eight Race Engineering and Nissan Motorsport respectively. Teams were free to develop new chassis and engine packages under the Gen 2 regulations, while the New Generation cars first introduced in 2013 remained eligible to compete.

The following drivers contested the 2018 championship.

Team changes

The Holden ZB Commodore was homologated, making it eligible to compete in the championship. All existing Holden teams commenced the season with the new car, either new chassis or reskinned VF Commodores. Triple Eight Race Engineering, who oversaw the development and homologation of the ZB chassis were also developing a V6 twin-turbocharged engine for Holden cars ahead of a full introduction in 2019. However, the programme was put on indefinite hold in April 2018. Triple Eight team were proposing to debut the V6 powerplant with a number of wildcard entries, however the discontinuation of the project resulted in this being scrapped.

Britek Motorsport left the championship. Its Racing Entitlements Contract (REC) was leased to Super2 Series team Matt Stone Racing who made their championship début entering an FG X Falcon built by DJR Team Penske. The team switched to competing with a VF Commodore mid-season. Lucas Dumbrell Motorsport (LDM) sold one of its RECs to Prodrive Racing Australia. LDM was rebranded as 23Red Racing after sponsor Phil Munday purchased a 60% stake in the team in the off-season, before taking full ownership in April 2018. The team competed with a Prodrive-built FG X Falcon.

Several teams underwent rebrandings. Prodrive Racing Australia became Tickford Racing after its lease on the Prodrive name expired, while Walkinshaw Racing was rebranded as Walkinshaw Andretti United when Andretti Autosport and United Autosports purchased stakes in the team.

Driver changes
Super2 Series drivers Todd Hazelwood and Anton de Pasquale made their Supercars début. Hazelwood joined Matt Stone Racing—the team he won the 2017 Super2 title with—while De Pasquale replaced Dale Wood at Erebus Motorsport. Wood was one of three drivers to leave the championship, as both Todd Kelly and Jason Bright retired from competition. Andre Heimgartner returned to the championship, replacing the retiring Kelly at Nissan Motorsport, while Richie Stanaway replaced Bright at Tickford Racing.

Will Davison moved from Tekno Autosports to the newly-formed 23Red Racing team. Davison's place at Tekno Autosports was filled by Super2 Series driver Jack Le Brocq. James Moffat left Garry Rogers Motorsport at the end of the 2017 championship and joined Tickford Racing for the Enduro Cup. Moffat's place at Garry Rogers Motorsport was taken by James Golding, who drove for the team in the Enduro Cup in 2016 and 2017.

Calendar

The calendar was expanded to sixteen events in 2018, with the following events taking place:

Calendar changes
The Melbourne Grand Prix Circuit, which hosted the Supercars Challenge non-championship event between 1996 and 2017, joined the calendar as a championship event for the first time. The event, which was named the Melbourne 400, continued to be run as part of the support bill for the Australian Grand Prix.

The Bend Motorsport Park in Tailem Bend, South Australia, the first permanent circuit to be built in Australia since Queensland Raceway in 1999, hosted an event of the championship. The Bend SuperSprint ran on the 4.9 km "International" configuration of the circuit.

Format changes

The Melbourne 400 event featured four races. All four were longer than the races that were run as part of the Australian Grand Prix support event in previous years, before it was granted championship status. Two of the races were run at twilight and included mandatory pit stops, while the other two were shorter sprint races run in daylight hours.

Sydney Motorsport Park hosted the Sydney SuperNight 300, which consisted of a single 300 km race held under lights. It was the first night race since the Yas Marina Circuit in Abu Dhabi hosted the opening event of the 2010 season. The event consisted of two 30 minute practice sessions and a 20-minute qualifying session ahead of a 300 km race. The race included three compulsory pit stops.

The Auckland SuperSprint included a Top 10 Shootout for the Sunday race. A Top 10 Shootout was added to the first race of the Gold Coast 600 after the Confederation of Australian Motor Sport suspended the licence of the Stadium Super Trucks support category on safety grounds, removing the category from the Supercars' support bill.

Rule changes

Sporting regulations
 A new qualifying format was introduced for the Symmons Plains, Barbagallo and Sydney Motorsport Park events. The system uses three stages similar to the system used in Formula One and was introduced as a response to the shorter layouts of the Symmons Plains and Barbagallo circuits which drew criticism about congestion as drivers on flying laps would encounter slow-moving cars preparing to start their own laps. The system was later added to the Sydney SuperNight 300 after proving popular during its trials at the Symmons Plains and Barbagallo events.
 The "wildcard" programme introduced in 2017, which allowed teams from the Dunlop Super2 Series to compete in the Supercars Championship, continued in 2018. Entries were open for the Winton, Hidden Valley, Ipswich and Tailem Bend events, while the Barbagallo event was discontinued after the 2017 edition failed to attract wildcard entries. The Bathurst 1000 was open to wildcard entries, but was separate to the wildcard programme for Super2 teams. No entries were received for the latter.
 The Confederation of Australian Motor Sport (CAMS) adjusted the eligibility requirements of the licensing system used by the championship. The revised requirements were designed to make it easier for Super2 drivers to qualify for a racing licence.

Results and standings

Season summary

Points system
Points were awarded for each race at an event, to the driver or drivers of a car that completed at least 75% of the race distance and was running at the completion of the race. At least 50% of the planned race distance must be completed for the result to be valid and championship points awarded.

Standard: Used for all SuperSprint and street races, including the Gold Coast 600.
Endurance: Used for the Sydney SuperNight 300, Sandown 500 and Bathurst 1000.
Melbourne (long): Used for Race 1 and 3 of the Melbourne 400.
Melbourne (short): Used for Race 2 and 4 of the Melbourne 400.

Drivers' championship

Teams' championship

Pirtek Enduro Cup

Champion Manufacturer of the Year
The Champion Manufacturer of the Year title was awarded to Holden.

Notes

References

External links

 Operations Manual, www.supercars.com, as archived at web.archive.org
 2018 Virgin Australia Supercars Championship Points, www.supercars.com, as archived at web.archive.org
 Virgin Australia Supercars Championship - Series Points Report - Final, racing.natsoft.com.au, as archived at web.archive.org
 Virgin Australia Supercars Championship - Teams Points Report, racing.natsoft.com.au, as archived at web.archive.org
 Pirtek Enduro Cup Points, www.supercars.com, as archived at web.archive.org

 

Supercars Championship seasons